Andreja Klepač and Magda Linette defeated Lucie Hradecká and Sania Mirza in the final, 6–2, 4–6, [10–7], to win the doubles tennis title at the 2022 Charleston Open. Klepač and Linette were making their team debut, and their victory earned Klepač her 11th career WTA Tour doubles title and Linette her first. Hradecká was competing to win her first title at the tournament after two prior runner-up finishes in 2017 and 2021, while two-time champion Mirza was making her first appearance since winning in 2015.

Nicole Melichar and Demi Schuurs were the defending champions, but they chose not to defend their title together. Schuurs partnered Desirae Krawczyk but lost in the first round to Anna Bondár and Magdalena Fręch. Melichar withdrew before the tournament.

Seeds

Draw

Draw

References

External links
Main draw

Charleston Open - Doubles
2022 Charleston Open - Doubles